Raphiglossoides is a small genus of afrotropical potter wasps known from South Africa. Only two species are currently known.

Gusenleitner described Raphiglossoides minutus as Gibbodynerus minutus.

References

Biological pest control wasps
Potter wasps
Hymenoptera genera